The Continental Cup 2001–02 was the fifth edition of the IIHF Continental Cup. The season started on September 21, 2001, and finished on February 13, 2002.

The tournament was won by ZSC Lions, who beat HC Milano Vipers in the final.

Preliminary round

Group A
(Ankara, Turkey)

Group A standings

Group B
(Sofia, Bulgaria)

Group B standings

Group C
(Bucharest, Romania)

Group C standings

Group D
(Dunaújváros, Hungary)

Group D standings

Group E
(Font-Romeu-Odeillo-Via, France)

Group E standings

Group F
(Tilburg, Netherlands)

Group F standings

First Group Stage

Group G
(Milan, Italy)

Group G standings

Group H
(Székesfehérvár, Hungary)

Group H standings

Group J
(Oświęcim, Poland)

Group J standings *

* :  HK Novi Sad was disqualified

Group K
(Prostějov, Czech Republic)

Group K standings

Group L
(Mikkeli, Finland)

Group L standings

Group M
(Anglet, France)

Group M standings

 AS Asiago,
 Vålerenga,
 ERC Ingolstadt,
 London Knights,
 HKm Zvolen,
 HC Lugano    :  bye

Second Group Stage

Group N
(Asiago, Italy)

Group N standings

Group O
(Zvolen, Slovakia)

Group O standings

Group P
(Oslo, Norway)

Group P standings

 ZSC Lions    :  bye

Final stage
(Zürich, Switzerland)

Semifinals

Third place match

Final

References
 Continental Cup 2002

2001–02 in European ice hockey
IIHF Continental Cup